The National Party is a political party in the Solomon Islands. 
At the legislative elections on 5 April 2006, the party won 6.9% of the vote and 4 out of 50 seats.

References

Political parties in the Solomon Islands